Oba station is located in the community of Oba, Ontario, Canada. This station is currently in use by Via Rail. Transcontinental The Canadian trains stop here.

Service by the Algoma Central Railway's passenger rail service ceased in July 2015.

References

External links
 Oba Via Rail information
 Oba ACR information

Algoma Central Railway stations
Railway stations in Algoma District
Via Rail stations in Ontario
Canadian National Railway stations in Ontario
Canadian Northern Railway stations in Ontario